Christopher Ogbonna Kanu  (born 4 December 1979) is a Nigerian former professional footballer who played as a right-back.

International career
In 2000 Kanu made his international debut for Nigeria in a World Cup qualifier against Eritrea.

Personal life
Christopher Kanu is the younger brother of former Portsmouth and Arsenal striker Nwankwo Kanu. In addition he is the stepbrother of Oghab midfielder Anderson "Anders" Gabolalmo Kanu and Henry Isaac.

References

External links
 
 

1979 births
Living people
People from Owerri
Sportspeople from Imo State
Igbo sportspeople
Nigerian footballers
Association football fullbacks
AFC Ajax players
FC Lugano players
Deportivo Alavés players
Sparta Rotterdam players
Peterborough United F.C. players
Dolphin F.C. (Nigeria) players
Eredivisie players
Swiss Super League players
La Liga players
Eerste Divisie players
English Football League players
Isthmian League players
Nigeria Professional Football League players
Nigeria international footballers
Olympic footballers of Nigeria
Footballers at the 2000 Summer Olympics
Nigerian expatriate footballers
Nigerian expatriate sportspeople in the Netherlands
Nigerian expatriate sportspeople in Switzerland
Nigerian expatriate sportspeople in Spain
Nigerian expatriate sportspeople in England
Expatriate footballers in the Netherlands
Expatriate footballers in Switzerland
Expatriate footballers in Spain
Expatriate footballers in England